Yves Michaud may refer to:

 Yves Michaud (philosopher) (born 1944), French philosopher
 Yves Michaud (politician) (born 1930), Quebec politician